Francesco Zerrllo (23 April 1931 – 14 May 2022) was an Italian Roman Catholic prelate.

Zerrillo was born in Italy and was ordained to the priesthood in 1954. He served as bishop of the Roman Catholic Diocese of Tricarico, Italy from 1986 to 1997 and served as bishop of the Roman Catholic Diocese of Lucera-Troia, Italy, from 1997 until his retirement in 2007.

References

1931 births
2022 deaths
20th-century Italian Roman Catholic bishops
21st-century Italian Roman Catholic bishops
Bishops appointed by Pope John Paul II
People from the Province of Benevento